William Peter Witty (born 24 February 1995) is an English rugby union player for Exeter Chiefs in Premiership Rugby.  

Witty made his Premiership debut for Newcastle Falcons in April 2015 against Gloucester.  On 17 March 2019, Exeter Chiefs announced his signing for the following season.

References

1995 births
Living people
English rugby union players
Newcastle Falcons players
Exeter Chiefs players
Rugby union locks
Rugby union players from Yorkshire